The Cadillac Gage Ranger is a four-wheeled armored personnel carrier produced by Cadillac Gage, built on a Dodge truck chassis. The largest customer was the United States Air Force, which the Ranger was marketed to in order to meet needed requirements as a security/patrol vehicle.

The vehicle is no longer offered by Textron with trademarks cancelled.

As of 2020, the Ranger's per unit replacement cost is at $230,720.

History
The Ranger was first produced in 1979 to meet a USAF requirement for its security forces, which was known as Peacekeeper. The first Rangers made were delivered in April 1980 with 571 vehicles under a contract of $30,532 each. In 1981, another order of 560 Rangers were made for the USAF and the US Navy. In 1994, around 708 were made and in service with the US military. In the same year, 20 Rangers were sold to Indonesia.

In 1996, any Rangers left in US military service were pressed into IFOR peacekeeping operations in the Balkans. Later on, they were sold to police forces throughout the US for SWAT use. The Humvee replaced them in the same role after the Rangers were phased out of service.

In 2000, the Cobb County Police Department acquired a Ranger thanks to the 1033 program.

In August 2004, Scott Ferguson was found guilty of stealing a Peacekeeper on display at the National Museum of the United States Air Force at Wright-Patterson Air Force Base, which started from August 1 to 10, 1998 when the vehicle was driven across state lines with the Peacekeeper sold on the black market on July 11, 1999. The incident started in July 1996 when Scott convinced superiors at the museum that the Peacekeeper vehicle had been requested by another military facility. The Peacekeeper was sighted in military conventions in Tennessee and Pennsylvania in 1997 and 1998 and was sold in 1999 for $18,000. The vehicle was resold to its current owner, the sheriff's office in Cherokee County, N.C., in May 2000 for $38,000.

In 2010, Federal Defense Industries announced that they entered into an agreement with Textron Marine & Land Systems in order to provide authorized aftermarket parts, support and other types of assistance for the Ranger since FDI maintains a technical library for spare parts.

In 2012, the South Pasadena Police Department has announced the delivery of a Ranger. It was acquired from Burbank Police as surplus from the USAF before they sold it to the SPPD for a dollar.

In 2014, the Chapel Hill Police Department reported a used Ranger was in operational service as an armored transport vehicle.

In 2016, the Salisbury Police Department acquired a used Ranger under the DOD's 1033 program.

In 2017, the Benton County Sheriff's Office acquired a used Ranger with the gun shield removed and the top port closed as it's meant to be used for armored transport purposes.

On February 4, 2020, the City Council of Anaheim approved a request to purchase a new armored vehicle to replace the 31-year old Ranger in service with the Anaheim Police Department.

Design

The Ranger was made by Cadillac Gage based on a Dodge truck chassis with a shorter wheelbase. The armored body was meant to protect the occupants from being injured or killed by shrapnel and small arms fire. The engine is located at the front, which is coupled to an automatic transmission system with three forward and one reverse gear. It was made from Cadloy armor plating that encompasses the entire vehicle, including the floor. It has a weight of 4,903 kg (10,809 lb) when loaded with a length of 5,030 mm (198 in) and height of 2,030 mm (80 in). The Ranger has a ground clearance of 203 mm (8.0 in) and a speed of 113 km/hr (70 mph) and operational range of 483 km (300 miles).

The Ranger allows for 4 people inside, consisting of two in the front and two at the back, who can enter and leave through the rear doors. Anyone seated inside can return fire through firing ports.

The vehicle can accommodate a turret equipped with dual 7.62mm NATO machine guns or a turret with a 7.62mm machine gun with a gun shield.

Defenseshield is contracted to provide replacement windows for Rangers used by various police departments in the US.

Variants

Peacekeeper II

Operators

Current operators
 
 As of 2020, two Rangers are in active USAF service.
 Anaheim Police Department, in the process of being replaced.
 Sacramento Police Department, Still present but used very infrequently.
 Benton County Sheriff's Office
 Becker County Sheriff's Office
 Chapel Hill Police Department
 Cherokee County Sheriff's Office
 Cobb County Police Department
 Montclair Police Department
 Neenah Police Department
 Prince George County Sheriff's Office
 Salisbury Police Department
 South Pasadena Police Department
 Modesto Police Department

Former operators
 : 20 Rangers adopted in service in 1994. Known to be used by Paspampres.
 
 : Formerly with US military service
 Was briefly used by US Border Patrol.
 Burbank Police Department
 Columbia Police Department
 Frederick Police Department
 San Joaquin County Sheriff's Office
 Tri-Cities Region S.W.A.T. Team

References

Wheeled armoured personnel carriers
Armored personnel carriers of the United States
Military vehicles introduced in the 1970s
All-wheel-drive vehicles